The 1950 Arizona State–Flagstaff Lumberjacks football team was an American football team that represented Arizona State College at Flagstaff (now known as Northern Arizona University) in the Border Conference during the 1950 college football season. In its first and only year under head coach Ben Reiges, the team compiled a 2–7 record (0–4 against conference opponents), was outscored by a total of 374 to 114, and finished last of nine teams in the Border Conference.

The team played its home games at Skidmore Field in Flagstaff, Arizona.

Schedule

References

Arizona State-Flagstaff
Northern Arizona Lumberjacks football seasons
Arizona State-Flagstaff Lumberjacks football